Mar Paul II Cheikho † (Arabic: بولس الثاني شيخو) (November 19, 1906–April 13, 1989) was the patriarch of the Chaldean Catholic Church from 1958 until his death in 1989.

Life

An ethnic Chaldean, he was born on November 19, 1906 in Alqosh and was ordained a priest on February 16, 1930. On May 4, 1947 he was ordained Bishop of Akra, Iraq, at the age of 40, by the Archbishop of Kirkuk Hormisdas Etienne Djibri.
 
From 1957 until his appointment as Patriarch of Babylon of the Chaldeans in 1958 Paul Cheikho served as bishop of Aleppo, Syria. He was the Patriarch of the Chaldean Church from 1958 until his death on April 13, 1989. He replaced Patriarch Yousef VII Ghanima and was followed by Raphael I Bidawid.

Notes

References

 

Iraqi Assyrian people
Iraqi archbishops
Chaldean Catholic Patriarchs of Babylon
Participants in the Second Vatican Council
Iraqi Eastern Catholics
1906 births
1989 deaths
People from Alqosh
20th-century Eastern Catholic archbishops
20th-century people from the Ottoman Empire
Assyrians from the Ottoman Empire
Eastern Catholic bishops in Syria